Montana is a state in the Mountain West division of the Western United States. It is bordered by Idaho to the west, North Dakota and South Dakota to the east, Wyoming to the south, and the Canadian provinces of Alberta, British Columbia, and Saskatchewan to the north. It is the fourth-largest state by area, the eighth-least populous state, and the third-least densely populated state. Its state capital is Helena, while the largest city is Billings. The western half of Montana contains numerous mountain ranges, while the eastern half is characterized by western prairie terrain and badlands, with smaller mountain ranges found throughout the state. The state has a reputation for a libertarian bent in popular opinion and policy. 

Montana has no official nickname but several unofficial ones, most notably "Big Sky Country", "The Treasure State", "Land of the Shining Mountains", and "The Last Best Place". Its economy is primarily based on agriculture, including ranching and cereal grain farming. Other significant economic resources include oil, gas, coal, mining, and lumber. The health care, service, and government sectors are also significant to the state's economy. Montana's fastest-growing sector is tourism, with 12.6 million tourists (as of 2019) visiting the state each year.

Etymology
The name Montana comes from the Spanish word montaña, which in turn comes from the Latin word montanea, meaning "mountain" or more broadly "mountainous country." Montaña del Norte was the name given by early Spanish explorers to the entire mountainous region of the west. The name Montana was added in 1863 to a bill by the United States House Committee on Territories (chaired at the time by James Ashley of Ohio) for the territory that would become Idaho Territory.

The name was changed by representatives Henry Wilson (Massachusetts) and Benjamin F. Harding (Oregon), who complained that Montana had "no meaning". When Ashley presented a bill to establish a temporary government in 1864 for a new territory to be carved out of Idaho, he again chose Montana Territory. This time, Rep. Samuel Cox, also of Ohio, objected to the name. Cox complained that the name was a misnomer given that most of the territory was not mountainous and thought a Native American name would be more appropriate than a Spanish one. Other names, such as Shoshone, were suggested, but the Committee on Territories decided that they had discretion to choose the name, so the original name of Montana was adopted.

History

Various indigenous peoples have inhabited the territory of the present-day state of Montana for thousands of years. Historic tribes encountered by Europeans and settlers from the United States included the Crow in the south-central area, the Cheyenne in the southeast, the Blackfeet, Assiniboine, and Gros Ventres in the central and north-central area, and the Kootenai and Salish in the west. The smaller Pend d'Oreille and Kalispel tribes lived near Flathead Lake and the western mountains, respectively. A part of southeastern Montana was used as a corridor between the Crows and the related Hidatsas in North Dakota.

As part of the Missouri River watershed, all of the land in Montana east of the Continental Divide was part of the Louisiana Purchase in 1803. Subsequent to and particularly in the decades following the Lewis and Clark Expedition, European, Canadian and American traders operated a fur trade, trading with indigenous peoples, in both eastern and western portions of what would become Montana. Though the increased interaction between fur traders and indigenous peoples frequently proved to be a profitable partnership, conflicts broke out when indigenous interests were threatened, such as the conflict between American trappers and the Blackfeet. Indigenous peoples in the region were also decimated by diseases introduced by fur traders to which they had no immunity. The trading post Fort Raymond (1807–1811) was constructed in Crow Indian country in 1807. Until the Oregon Treaty of 1846, land west of the continental divide was disputed between the British and U.S. governments and was known as the Oregon Country. The first permanent settlement by Euro-Americans in what today is Montana was St. Mary's, established in 1841 near present-day Stevensville. In 1847, Fort Benton was built as the uppermost fur-trading post on the Missouri River. In the 1850s, settlers began moving into the Beaverhead and Big Hole valleys from the Oregon Trail and into the Clark's Fork valley.

The first gold discovered in Montana was at Gold Creek near present-day Garrison in 1852. Gold rushes to the region commenced in earnest starting in 1862. A series of major mineral discoveries in the western part of the state found gold, silver, copper, lead, and coal (and later oil) which attracted tens of thousands of miners to the area. The richest of all gold placer diggings was discovered at Alder Gulch, where the town of Virginia City was established. Other rich placer deposits were found at Last Chance Gulch, where the city of Helena now stands, Confederate Gulch, Silver Bow, Emigrant Gulch, and Cooke City. Gold output between 1862 and 1876 reached $144 million, after which silver became even more important. The largest mining operations were at Butte, with important silver deposits and expansive copper deposits.

Montana territory

Before the creation of Montana Territory (1864–1889), areas within present-day Montana were part of the Oregon Territory (1848–1859), Washington Territory (1853–1863), Idaho Territory (1863–1864), and Dakota Territory (1861–1864). Montana Territory became one of the territories of the United States on May 26, 1864. The first territorial capital was located at Bannack. Sidney Edgerton served as the first territorial governor. The capital moved to Virginia City in 1865 and to Helena in 1875. In 1870, the non-Indian population of the Montana Territory was 20,595. The Montana Historical Society, founded on February 2, 1865, in Virginia City, is the oldest such institution west of the Mississippi (excluding Louisiana). In 1869 and 1870 respectively, the Cook–Folsom–Peterson and the Washburn–Langford–Doane Expeditions were launched from Helena into the Upper Yellowstone region. The extraordinary discoveries and reports from these expeditions led to the creation of Yellowstone National Park in 1872.

Conflicts

As settlers began populating Montana from the 1850s through the 1870s, disputes with Native Americans ensued, primarily over land ownership and control. In 1855, Washington Territorial Governor Isaac Stevens negotiated the Hellgate Treaty between the United States government and the Salish, Pend d'Oreille, and Kootenai people of western Montana, which established boundaries for the tribal nations. The treaty was ratified in 1859. While the treaty established what later became the Flathead Indian Reservation, trouble with interpreters and confusion over the terms of the treaty led Whites to believe the Bitterroot Valley was opened to settlement, but the tribal nations disputed those provisions. The Salish remained in the Bitterroot Valley until 1891.

The first U.S. Army post established in Montana was Camp Cooke in 1866, on the Missouri River, to protect steamboat traffic to Fort Benton. More than a dozen additional military outposts were established in the state. Pressure over land ownership and control increased due to discoveries of gold in various parts of Montana and surrounding states. Major battles occurred in Montana during Red Cloud's War, the Great Sioux War of 1876, and the Nez Perce War and in conflicts with Piegan Blackfeet. The most notable were the Marias Massacre (1870), Battle of the Little Bighorn (1876), Battle of the Big Hole (1877), and Battle of Bear Paw (1877). The last recorded conflict in Montana between the U.S. Army and Native Americans occurred in 1887 during the Battle of Crow Agency in the Big Horn country. Native survivors who had signed treaties were generally required to move onto reservations.

Simultaneously with these conflicts, bison, a keystone species and the primary protein source that Native people had survived on for many centuries, were being destroyed. Experts estimate that around 13 million bison roamed Montana in 1870. In 1875, General Philip Sheridan pleaded to a joint session of Congress to authorize the slaughtering of bison herds to deprive Native people of their source of food. By 1884, commercial hunting had brought bison to the verge of extinction; only about 325 bison remained in the entire United States.

Cattle ranching
Cattle ranching has been central to Montana's history and economy since Johnny Grant began wintering cattle in the Deer Lodge Valley in the 1850s and traded cattle fattened in fertile Montana valleys with emigrants on the Oregon Trail. Nelson Story brought the first Texas Longhorn cattle into the territory in 1866. Granville Stuart, Samuel Hauser, and Andrew J. Davis started a major open-range cattle operation in Fergus County in 1879. The Grant-Kohrs Ranch National Historic Site in Deer Lodge is maintained today as a link to the ranching style of the late 19th century. Operated by the National Park Service, it is a  working ranch.

Railroads

Tracks of the Northern Pacific Railroad (NPR) reached Montana from the west in 1881 and from the east in 1882. However, the railroad played a major role in sparking tensions with Native American tribes in the 1870s. Jay Cooke, the NPR president, launched major surveys into the Yellowstone valley in 1871, 1872, and 1873, which were challenged forcefully by the Sioux under chief Sitting Bull. These clashes, in part, contributed to the Panic of 1873, a financial crisis that delayed the construction of the railroad into Montana. Surveys in 1874, 1875, and 1876 helped spark the Great Sioux War of 1876. The transcontinental NPR was completed on September 8, 1883, at Gold Creek.

In 1881, the Utah and Northern Railway, a branch line of the Union Pacific, completed a narrow-gauge line from northern Utah to Butte. A number of smaller spur lines operated in Montana from 1881 into the 20th century, including the Oregon Short Line, Montana Railroad, and Milwaukee Road.

Tracks of the Great Northern Railroad (GNR) reached eastern Montana in 1887 and when they reached the northern Rocky Mountains in 1890, the GNR became a significant promoter of tourism to Glacier National Park region. The transcontinental GNR was completed on January 6, 1893, at Scenic, Washington and is known as the Hi Line, being the northern most transcontinental rail line in the United States.

Statehood

Under Territorial Governor Thomas Meagher, Montanans held a constitutional convention in 1866 in a failed bid for statehood. A second constitutional convention held in Helena in 1884 produced a constitution ratified 3:1 by Montana citizens in November 1884. For political reasons, Congress did not approve Montana statehood until February 1889 and President Grover Cleveland signed an omnibus bill granting statehood to Montana, North Dakota, South Dakota, and Washington once the appropriate state constitutions were crafted. In July 1889, Montanans convened their third constitutional convention and produced a constitution accepted by the people and the federal government. On November 8, 1889, President Benjamin Harrison proclaimed Montana the union's 41st state. The first state governor was Joseph K. Toole. In the 1880s, Helena (the state capital) had more millionaires per capita than any other United States city.

Homesteading
The Homestead Act of 1862 provided free land to settlers who could claim and "prove-up"  of federal land in the Midwest and western United States. Montana did not see a large influx of immigrants from this act because 160 acres were usually insufficient to support a family in the arid territory. The first homestead claim under the act in Montana was made by David Carpenter near Helena in 1868. The first claim by a woman was made near Warm Springs Creek by Gwenllian Evans, the daughter of Deer Lodge Montana pioneer, Morgan Evans. By 1880, farms were in the more verdant valleys of central and western Montana, but few were on the eastern plains.

The Desert Land Act of 1877 was passed to allow settlement of arid lands in the west and allotted  to settlers for a fee of $.25 per acre and a promise to irrigate the land. After three years, a fee of one dollar per acre would be paid and the settler would own the land. This act brought mostly cattle and sheep ranchers into Montana, many of whom grazed their herds on the Montana prairie for three years, did little to irrigate the land and then abandoned it without paying the final fees. Some farmers came with the arrival of the Great Northern and Northern Pacific Railroads throughout the 1880s and 1890s, though in relatively small numbers.

In the early 1900s, James J. Hill of the Great Northern began to promote settlement in the Montana prairie to fill his trains with settlers and goods. Other railroads followed suit. In 1902, the Reclamation Act was passed, allowing irrigation projects to be built in Montana's eastern river valleys. In 1916, the Stock-Raising Homestead Act allowed homesteads of 640 acres in areas unsuitable for irrigation. This combination of advertising and changes in the Homestead Act drew tens of thousands of homesteaders, lured by free land, with World War I bringing particularly high wheat prices. In addition, Montana was going through a temporary period of higher-than-average precipitation. Homesteaders arriving in this period were known as "honyockers", or "scissorbills". The word honyocker possibly derived from the ethnic slur hunyak and was applied in a derisive manner at homesteaders, who were perceived as being "greenhorns", "new at his business", or "unprepared". However, most of these new settlers had farming experience, though many did not.

However, farmers faced a number of problems. Massive debt was one. Also, most settlers were from wetter regions, unprepared for the dry climate, lack of trees, and scarce water resources. Weather and agricultural conditions are much harsher and drier west of the 100th meridian. Then, the droughts of 1917–1921 proved devastating. Many people left, and half the banks in the state went bankrupt as a result of providing mortgages that could not be repaid. As a result, farm sizes increased while the number of farms decreased.

By 1910, homesteaders filed claims on over five million acres, and by 1923, over 93 million acres were farmed. In 1910, the Great Falls land office alone had more than a thousand homestead filings per month, and at the peak of 1917–1918 it had 14,000 new homesteads each year. Significant drops occurred following the drought in 1919.

Montana and World War I
As World War I broke out, Jeannette Rankin, representative of Montana and the first woman in the United States to be a member of Congress, voted against the United States' declaration of war. Her actions were widely criticized in Montana, where support for the war and patriotism was strong. In 1917–1918, due to a miscalculation of Montana's population, about 40,000 Montanans, 10% of the state's population, volunteered or were drafted into the armed forces. This represented a manpower contribution to the war that was 25% higher than any other state on a per capita basis. Around 1,500 Montanans died as a result of the war and 2,437 were wounded, also higher than any other state on a per capita basis. Montana's Remount station in Miles City provided 10,000 cavalry horses for the war, more than any other Army post in the country. The war created a boom for Montana mining, lumber, and farming interests, as demand for war materials and food increased.

In June 1917, the U.S. Congress passed the Espionage Act of 1917, which was extended by the Sedition Act of 1918. In February 1918, the Montana legislature had passed the Montana Sedition Act, which was a model for the federal version. In combination, these laws criminalized criticism of the U.S. government, military, or symbols through speech or other means. The Montana Act led to the arrest of more than 200 individuals and the conviction of 78, mostly of German or Austrian descent. More than 40 spent time in prison. In May 2006, then-Governor Brian Schweitzer posthumously issued full pardons for all those convicted of violating the Montana Sedition Act.

The Montanans who opposed U.S. entry into the war included immigrant groups of German and Irish heritage, as well as pacifist Anabaptist people such as the Hutterites and Mennonites, many of whom were also of Germanic heritage. In turn, pro-War groups formed, such as the Montana Council of Defense, created by Governor Samuel V. Stewart and local "loyalty committees".

War sentiment was complicated by labor issues. The Anaconda Copper Company, which was at its historic peak of copper production, was an extremely powerful force in Montana, but it also faced criticism and opposition from socialist newspapers and unions struggling to make gains for their members. In Butte, a multiethnic community with a significant European immigrant population, labor unions, particularly the newly formed Metal Mine Workers' Union, opposed the war on grounds it mostly profited large lumber and mining interests. In the wake of ramped-up mine production and the Speculator Mine disaster in June 1917, Industrial Workers of the World organizer Frank Little arrived in Butte to organize miners. He gave some speeches with inflammatory antiwar rhetoric. On August 1, 1917, he was dragged from his boarding house by masked vigilantes, and hanged from a railroad trestle, considered a lynching. Little's murder and the strikes that followed resulted in the National Guard being sent to Butte to restore order. Overall, anti-German and antilabor sentiment increased and created a movement that led to the passage of the Montana Sedition Act the following February. In addition, the Council of Defense was made a state agency with the power to prosecute and punish individuals deemed in violation of the Act. The council also passed rules limiting public gatherings and prohibiting the speaking of German in public.

In the wake of the legislative action in 1918, emotions rose. U.S. Attorney Burton K. Wheeler and several district court judges who hesitated to prosecute or convict people brought up on charges were strongly criticized. Wheeler was brought before the Council of Defense, though he avoided formal proceedings, and a district court judge from Forsyth was impeached. Burnings of German-language books and several near-hangings occurred. The prohibition on speaking German remained in effect into the early 1920s. Complicating the wartime struggles, the 1918 influenza epidemic claimed the lives of more than 5,000 Montanans. The suppression of civil liberties that occurred led some historians to dub this period "Montana's Agony".

Depression era
An economic depression began in Montana after World War I and lasted through the Great Depression until the beginning of World War II. This caused great hardship for farmers, ranchers, and miners. The wheat farms in eastern Montana make the state a major producer; the wheat has a relatively high protein content, thus commands premium prices.

Montana and World War II

By the time the U.S. entered World War II on December 8, 1941, many Montanans had enlisted in the military to escape the poor national economy of the previous decade. Another 40,000-plus Montanans entered the armed forces in the first year following the declaration of war, and more than 57,000 joined up before the war ended. These numbers constituted about ten percent of the state's population, and Montana again contributed one of the highest numbers of soldiers per capita of any state. Many Native Americans were among those who served, including soldiers from the Crow Nation who became Code Talkers. At least 1,500 Montanans died in the war. Montana also was the training ground for the First Special Service Force or "Devil's Brigade", a joint U.S.-Canadian commando-style force that trained at Fort William Henry Harrison for experience in mountainous and winter conditions before deployment. Air bases were built in Great Falls, Lewistown, Cut Bank, and Glasgow, some of which were used as staging areas to prepare planes to be sent to allied forces in the Soviet Union. During the war, about 30 Japanese Fu-Go balloon bombs were documented to have landed in Montana, though no casualties nor major forest fires were attributed to them.

In 1940, Jeannette Rankin was again elected to Congress. In 1941, as she had in 1917, she voted against the United States' declaration of war after the Japanese attack on Pearl Harbor. Hers was the only vote against the war, and in the wake of public outcry over her vote, Rankin required police protection for a time. Other pacifists tended to be those from "peace churches" who generally opposed war. Many individuals claiming conscientious objector status from throughout the U.S. were sent to Montana during the war as smokejumpers and for other forest fire-fighting duties.

In 1942, the U.S. Army established Camp Rimini near Helena for the purpose of training sled dogs in winter weather.

Other military
During World War II, the planned battleship USS Montana was named in honor of the state but it was never completed. Montana is the only one of the first 48 states lacking a completed battleship being named for it. Alaska and Hawaii have both had nuclear submarines named after them. Montana is the only state in the union without a modern naval ship named in its honor. However, in August 2007, Senator Jon Tester asked that a submarine be christened USS Montana. Secretary of the Navy Ray Mabus announced on September 3, 2015, that Virginia Class attack submarine SSN-794 will become the second commissioned warship to bear the name.

Cold War Montana
In the post-World War II Cold War era, Montana became host to U.S. Air Force Military Air Transport Service (1947) for airlift training in C-54 Skymasters and eventually, in 1953 Strategic Air Command air and missile forces were based at Malmstrom Air Force Base in Great Falls. The base also hosted the 29th Fighter Interceptor Squadron, Air Defense Command from 1953 to 1968. In December 1959, Malmstrom AFB was selected as the home of the new Minuteman I intercontinental ballistic missile. The first operational missiles were in place and ready in early 1962. In late 1962, missiles assigned to the 341st Strategic Missile Wing played a major role in the Cuban Missile Crisis. When the Soviets removed their missiles from Cuba, President John F. Kennedy said the Soviets backed down because they knew he had an "ace in the hole", referring directly to the Minuteman missiles in Montana. Montana eventually became home to the largest ICBM field in the U.S. covering .

Geography

Montana is one of the eight Mountain States, located in the north of the region known as the Western United States. It borders North Dakota and South Dakota to the east. Wyoming is to the south, Idaho is to the west and southwest, and the Canadian provinces of British Columbia, Alberta, and Saskatchewan are to the north, making it the only state to border three Canadian provinces.

It is the fourth-largest state in the United States after Alaska, Texas, and California, and the largest landlocked state.

Topography

The state's topography is roughly defined by the Continental Divide, which splits much of the state into distinct eastern and western regions. Most of Montana's hundred or more named mountain ranges are in the state's western half, most of which is geologically and geographically part of the northern Rocky Mountains. The Absaroka and Beartooth ranges in the state's south-central part are technically part of the Central Rocky Mountains. The Rocky Mountain Front is a significant feature in the state's north-central portion, and isolated island ranges that interrupt the prairie landscape common in the central and eastern parts of the state. About 60 percent of the state is prairie, part of the northern Great Plains.

The Bitterroot Mountains—one of the longest continuous ranges in the Rocky Mountain chain from Alaska to Mexico—along with smaller ranges, including the Coeur d'Alene Mountains and the Cabinet Mountains, divide the state from Idaho. The southern third of the Bitterroot range blends into the Continental Divide. Other major mountain ranges west of the divide include the Cabinet Mountains, the Anaconda Range, the Missions, the Garnet Range, the Sapphire Mountains, and the Flint Creek Range.

The divide's northern section, where the mountains rapidly give way to prairie, is part of the Rocky Mountain Front. The front is most pronounced in the Lewis Range, located primarily in Glacier National Park. Due to the configuration of mountain ranges in Glacier National Park, the Northern Divide (which begins in Alaska's Seward Peninsula) crosses this region and turns east in Montana at Triple Divide Peak. It causes the Waterton River, Belly, and Saint Mary rivers to flow north into Alberta, Canada. There they join the Saskatchewan River, which ultimately empties into Hudson Bay.

East of the divide, several roughly parallel ranges cover the state's southern part, including the Gravelly Range, Madison Range, Gallatin Range, Absaroka Mountains, and Beartooth Mountains. North of these ranges are the Big Belt Mountains, Bridger Mountains, Tobacco Roots, and several island ranges, including the Crazy Mountains and Little Belt Mountains.

Between many mountain ranges are several rich river valleys. The Big Hole, Bitterroot, Gallatin, Flathead, and Paradise Valleys have extensive agricultural resources and multiple opportunities for tourism and recreation.

East and north of this transition zone are the expansive and sparsely populated Northern Plains, with tableland prairies, smaller island mountain ranges, and badlands. The isolated island ranges east of the Divide include the Bear Paw Mountains, Bull Mountains, Castle Mountains, Crazy Mountains, Highwood Mountains, Judith Mountains, Little Belt Mountains, Little Rocky Mountains, the Pryor Mountains, Little Snowy Mountains, Big Snowy Mountains, Sweet Grass Hills, and—in the state's southeastern corner near Ekalaka—the Long Pines. Many of these isolated eastern ranges were created about 120 to 66 million years ago when magma welling up from the interior cracked and bowed the earth's surface here.

The area east of the divide in the state's north-central portion is known for the Missouri Breaks and other significant rock formations. Three buttes south of Great Falls are major landmarks: Cascade, Crown, Square, Shaw, and Buttes. Known as laccoliths, they formed when igneous rock protruded through cracks in the sedimentary rock. The underlying surface consists of sandstone and shale. Surface soils in the area are highly diverse, and greatly affected by the local geology, whether glaciated plain, intermountain basin, mountain foothills, or tableland. Foothill regions are often covered in weathered stone or broken slate, or consist of uncovered bare rock (usually igneous, quartzite, sandstone, or shale). The soil of intermountain basins usually consists of clay, gravel, sand, silt, and volcanic ash, much of it laid down by lakes which covered the region during the Oligocene 33 to 23 million years ago. Tablelands are often topped with argillite gravel and weathered quartzite, occasionally underlain by shale. The glaciated plains are generally covered in clay, gravel, sand, and silt left by the proglacial Lake Great Falls or by moraines or gravel-covered former lake basins left by the Wisconsin glaciation 85,000 to 11,000 years ago. Farther east, areas such as Makoshika State Park near Glendive and Medicine Rocks State Park near Ekalaka contain some of the most scenic badlands regions in the state.

The Hell Creek Formation in Northeast Montana is a major source of dinosaur fossils. Paleontologist Jack Horner of the Museum of the Rockies in Bozeman brought this formation to the world's attention with several major finds.

Rivers, lakes and reservoirs

Montana has thousands of named rivers and creeks,  of which are known for "blue-ribbon" trout fishing. Montana's water resources provide for recreation, hydropower, crop and forage irrigation, mining, and water for human consumption.

Montana is one of few geographic areas in the world whose rivers form parts of three major watersheds (i.e. where two continental divides intersect). Its rivers feed the Pacific Ocean, the Gulf of Mexico, and Hudson Bay. The watersheds divide at Triple Divide Peak in Glacier National Park. If Hudson Bay is considered part of the Arctic Ocean, Triple Divide Peak is the only place on Earth with drainage to three different oceans.

Pacific Ocean drainage basin

All waters in Montana west of the divide flow into the Columbia River. The Clark Fork of the Columbia (not to be confused with the Clarks Fork of the Yellowstone River) rises near Butte and flows northwest to Missoula, where it is joined by the Blackfoot River and Bitterroot River. Farther downstream, it is joined by the Flathead River before entering Idaho near Lake Pend Oreille. The Pend Oreille River forms the outflow of Lake Pend Oreille. The Clark Fork discharges the greatest volume of water of any river exiting the state. The Kootenai River in northwest Montana is another major tributary of the Columbia.

Gulf of Mexico drainage basin
East of the divide the Missouri River, which is formed by the confluence of the Jefferson, Madison, and Gallatin Rivers near Three Forks, flows due north through the west-central part of the state to Great Falls. From this point, it then flows generally east through fairly flat agricultural land and the Missouri Breaks to Fort Peck reservoir. The stretch of river between Fort Benton and the Fred Robinson Bridge at the western boundary of Fort Peck Reservoir was designated a National Wild and Scenic River in 1976. The Missouri enters North Dakota near Fort Union, having drained more than half the land area of Montana. Nearly one-third of the Missouri River in Montana lies behind 10 dams: Toston, Canyon Ferry, Hauser, Holter, Black Eagle, Rainbow, Cochrane, Ryan, Morony, and Fort Peck. Other major Montana tributaries of the Missouri include the Smith, Milk, Marias, Judith, and Musselshell Rivers. Montana also claims the disputed title of possessing the world's shortest river, the Roe River, just outside Great Falls. Through the Missouri, these rivers ultimately join the Mississippi River and flow into the Gulf of Mexico.

Hell Roaring Creek begins in southern Montana, and when combined with the Red Rock, Beaverhead, Jefferson, Missouri, and Mississippi River, is the longest river in North America and the fourth longest river in the world.

The Yellowstone River rises on the Continental Divide near Younts Peak in Wyoming's Teton Wilderness. It flows north through Yellowstone National Park, enters Montana near Gardiner, and passes through the Paradise Valley to Livingston. It then flows northeasterly across the state through Billings, Miles City, Glendive, and Sidney. The Yellowstone joins the Missouri in North Dakota just east of Fort Union. It is the longest undammed, free-flowing river in the contiguous United States, and drains about a quarter of Montana. Major tributaries of the Yellowstone include the Boulder, Stillwater, Clarks Fork, Bighorn, Tongue, and Powder Rivers.

Hudson Bay drainage basin
The Northern Divide turns east in Montana at Triple Divide Peak, causing the Waterton, Belly, and Saint Mary Rivers to flow north into Alberta. There they join the Saskatchewan River, which ultimately empties into Hudson Bay.

Lakes and reservoirs
Montana has some 3,000 named lakes and reservoirs, including Flathead Lake, the largest natural freshwater lake in the western United States. Other major lakes include Whitefish Lake in the Flathead Valley and Lake McDonald and St. Mary Lake in Glacier National Park. The largest reservoir in the state is Fort Peck Reservoir on the Missouri river, which is contained by the second largest earthen dam and largest hydraulically filled dam in the world. Other major reservoirs include Hungry Horse on the Flathead River; Lake Koocanusa on the Kootenai River; Lake Elwell on the Marias River; Clark Canyon on the Beaverhead River; Yellowtail on the Bighorn River, Canyon Ferry, Hauser, Holter, Rainbow; and Black Eagle on the Missouri River.

Flora and fauna

Vegetation of the state includes lodgepole pine, ponderosa pine, Douglas fir, larch, spruce, aspen, birch, red cedar, hemlock, ash, alder, rocky mountain maple and cottonwood trees. Forests cover about 25% of the state. Flowers native to Montana include asters, bitterroots, daisies, lupins, poppies, primroses, columbine, lilies, orchids, and dryads. Several species of sagebrush and cactus and many species of grasses are common. Many species of mushrooms and lichens are also found in the state.

Montana is home to diverse fauna including 14 amphibian, 90 fish, 117 mammal, 20 reptile, and 427 bird species. Additionally, more than 10,000 invertebrate species are present, including 180 mollusks and 30 crustaceans. Montana has the largest grizzly bear population in the lower 48 states. Montana hosts five federally endangered species–black-footed ferret, whooping crane, least tern, pallid sturgeon, and white sturgeon and seven threatened species including the grizzly bear, Canadian lynx, and bull trout. Since re-introduction the gray wolf population has stabilized at about 900 animals, and they have been delisted as endangered. The Montana Department of Fish, Wildlife and Parks manages fishing and hunting seasons for at least 17 species of game fish, including seven species of trout, walleye, and smallmouth bass and at least 29 species of game birds and animals including ring-neck pheasant, grey partridge, elk, pronghorn antelope, mule deer, whitetail deer, gray wolf, and bighorn sheep.

Protected lands

Montana contains Glacier National Park, "The Crown of the Continent", and parts of Yellowstone National Park, including three of the park's five entrances. Other federally recognized sites include the Little Bighorn National Monument, Bighorn Canyon National Recreation Area, and Big Hole National Battlefield. The Bison Range is managed by the Confederated Salish and Kootenai Tribes and the American Prairie is owned and operated by a nonprofit organization.

The U.S. Department of Agriculture Forest Service administers  of forest land in ten National Forests. The U.S. Department of the Interior Bureau of Land Management controls  of federal land. The U.S. Department of the Interior Fish and Wildlife Service administers  of 1.1 million acres of National Wildlife Refuges and waterfowl production areas in Montana. The Montana Department of Natural Resources and Conservation manages  of School Trust Land ceded by the federal government under the Land Ordinance of 1785 to the state in 1889 when Montana was granted statehood. These lands are managed by the state for the benefit of public schools and institutions in the state.

Areas managed by the National Park Service include:
 Big Hole National Battlefield near Wisdom
 Bighorn Canyon National Recreation Area near Fort Smith
 Glacier National Park
 Grant-Kohrs Ranch National Historic Site at Deer Lodge
 Lewis and Clark National Historic Trail
 Little Bighorn Battlefield National Monument near Crow Agency
 Nez Perce National Historical Park
 Yellowstone National Park

Climate

Montana is a large state with considerable variation in geography, topography and elevation, and the climate is equally varied. The western half is mountainous, interrupted by numerous large valleys. Eastern Montana comprises plains and badlands, broken by hills and isolated mountain ranges, and has a semi-arid, continental climate (Köppen climate classification BSk). The Continental Divide has a considerable effect on the climate, as it restricts the flow of warmer air from the Pacific from moving east, and drier continental air from moving west. The area west of the divide has a modified northern Pacific Coast climate, with milder winters, cooler summers, less wind, and a longer growing season. Low clouds and fog often form in the valleys west of the divide in winter, but this is rarely seen in the east.

The variation in geography leads to great variation in temperature. Throughout the state, summer nights are generally cool and pleasant. Extreme hot weather is less common above . Snowfall has been recorded in all months of the year in the more mountainous areas of central and western Montana, though it is rare in July and August.

The coldest temperature on record for Montana is also the coldest temperature for the contiguous United States. On January 20, 1954,  was recorded at a gold mining camp near Rogers Pass. Winter cold spells are usually the result of cold continental air coming south from Canada. The front is often well defined, causing a large temperature drop in a 24-hour period. Conversely, air flow from the southwest results in "chinooks".

Loma is the site of the most extreme recorded temperature change in a 24-hour period in the United States.

The mountain ranges block the moist Pacific air, holding moisture in the western valleys, and creating rain shadows to the east. Heron, in the west, receives the most precipitation, . On the eastern (leeward) side of a mountain range, the valleys are much drier; Lonepine averages , and Deer Lodge  of precipitation. An area southwest of Belfry averaged only  over a 16-year period. Most of the larger cities get  of snow each year. Mountain ranges can accumulate  of snow during a winter. Heavy snowstorms may occur from September through May, though most snow falls from November to March.

The climate has become warmer in Montana and continues to do so. The glaciers in Glacier National Park have receded and are predicted to melt away completely in a few decades. Many Montana cities set heat records during July 2007, the hottest month ever recorded in Montana. Winters are warmer, too, and have fewer cold spells. Previously, these cold spells had killed off bark beetles, but these are now attacking the forests of western Montana. The warmer winters in the region have allowed various species to expand their ranges and proliferate. The combination of warmer weather, attack by beetles, and mismanagement has led to a substantial increase in the severity of forest fires in Montana. According to a study done for the U.S. Environmental Protection Agency by the Harvard School of Engineering and Applied Science, parts of Montana will experience a 200% increase in area burned by wildfires and an 80% increase in related air pollution.

The table below lists average temperatures for the warmest and coldest month for Montana's seven largest cities. The coldest month varies between December and January depending on location, although figures are similar throughout.

Antipodes
Montana is one of only two contiguous states (along with Colorado) that are antipodal to land. The Kerguelen Islands are antipodal to the Montana–Saskatchewan–Alberta border. No towns are precisely antipodal to Kerguelen, though Chester and Rudyard are close.

Cities and towns

Montana has 56 counties and a total of 364 "places" as defined by the United States Census Bureau; the latter comprising 129 incorporated places and 235 census-designated places. The incorporated places are made up of 52 cities, 75 towns, and two consolidated city-counties.

Montana has one city, Billings, with a population over 100,000; and three cities with populations over 50,000: Missoula, Great Falls and Bozeman. The state also has five Micropolitan Statistical Areas, centered on Bozeman, Butte, Helena, Kalispell and Havre.

Collectively all of these areas (excluding Havre) are known informally as the "big seven", as they are consistently the seven largest communities in the state (their rank order in terms of population is Billings, Missoula, Great Falls, Bozeman, Butte, Helena and Kalispell, according to the 2010 U.S. census). Based on 2013 census numbers, they contain 35 percent of Montana's population, and the counties in which they are located are home to 62 percent of the state's population.

The geographic center of population of Montana is in sparsely populated Meagher County, in the town of White Sulphur Springs.

Demographics

The United States Census Bureau states that the population of Montana was 1,085,407 on April 1, 2020, an 9.7% increase since the 2010 United States census. The 2010 census put Montana's population at 989,415. During the first decade of the new century, growth was mainly concentrated in Montana's seven largest counties, with the highest percentage growth in Gallatin County, which had a 32% increase in its population from 2000 to 2010. The city having the largest percentage growth was Kalispell, with 40.1%, and the city with the largest increase in actual residents was Billings, with an increase in population of 14,323 from 2000 to 2010.

On January 3, 2012, the Census and Economic Information Center (CEIC) at the Montana Department of Commerce estimated Montana had hit the one million population mark sometime between November and December 2011.

According to HUD's 2022 Annual Homeless Assessment Report, there were an estimated 1,585 homeless people in Montana. 

According to the 2020 census, 88.9% of the population was White (87.8% non-Hispanic White),  6.7% American Indian and Alaska Native, 4.1% Hispanics and Latinos of any race, 0.9% Asian, 0.6% Black or African American, 0.1% Native Hawaiian and other Pacific Islander, and 2.8% from two or more races. The largest European ancestry groups in Montana as of 2010 were: German (27.0%), Irish (14.8%), English (12.6%), Norwegian (10.9%), French (4.7%), and Italian (3.4%).

Intrastate demographics
Montana has a larger Native American population, both numerically and as a percentage, than most U.S. states. Ranked 45th in population (by the 2010 census) it is 19th in native people, who are 6.5% of the state's population—the sixth-highest percentage of all fifty states. Of Montana's 56 counties, Native Americans constitute a majority in three: Big Horn, Glacier, and Roosevelt. Other counties with large Native American populations include Blaine, Cascade, Hill, Missoula, and Yellowstone Counties. The state's Native American population grew by 27.9% between 1980 and 1990 (at a time when Montana's entire population rose 1.6%), and by 18.5 percent between 2000 and 2010.

As of 2009, almost two-thirds of Native Americans in the state live in urban areas. Of Montana's 20 largest cities, Polson (15.7%), Havre (13.0%), Great Falls (5.0%), Billings (4.4%), and Anaconda (3.1%) had the greatest percentages of Native American residents in 2010. Billings (4,619), Great Falls (2,942), Missoula (1,838), Havre (1,210), and Polson (706) have the most Native Americans living there. The state's seven reservations include more than 12 distinct Native American ethnolinguistic groups.

While the largest European American population in Montana is German (which may also include Austrian and Swiss, among other groups), pockets of significant Scandinavian ancestry are prevalent in some of the farming-dominated northern and eastern prairie regions, parallel to nearby regions of North Dakota and Minnesota. Farmers of Irish, Scots, and English roots also settled in Montana. The historically mining-oriented communities of western Montana such as Butte have a wider range of European American ethnicity; Finns, Eastern Europeans and especially Irish settlers left an indelible mark on the area, as well as people originally from British mining regions such as Cornwall, Devon, and Wales. The nearby city of Helena, also founded as a mining camp, had a similar mix in addition to a small Chinatown. Many of Montana's historic logging communities originally attracted people of Scottish, Scandinavian, Slavic, English, and Scotch-Irish descent.

The Hutterites, an Anabaptist sect originally from Switzerland, settled in Montana, and today is second only to South Dakota in U.S. Hutterite population, with several colonies across the state. Beginning in the mid-1990s, the state also had an influx of Amish, who moved to Montana from increasingly urbanized areas of Ohio and Pennsylvania.

Montana's Hispanic population is concentrated in the Billings area in south-central Montana, where many of Montana's Mexican Americans have been in the state for generations. Great Falls has the highest percentage of African Americans in its population, although Billings has more African American residents than Great Falls.

The Chinese in Montana, while a low percentage today, have been a historically important presence. About 2,000–3,000 Chinese miners were in the mining areas of Montana by 1870, and 2,500 in 1890. However, public opinion grew increasingly negative towards them in the 1890s, and nearly half of the state's Asian population left by 1900. Today, the Missoula area has a large Hmong population and the nearly 3,000 Montanans who claim Filipino ancestry are the largest Asian American group in the state.

In the 2015 United States census estimates, Montana had the second-highest percentage of U.S. military veterans living there. Only the state of Alaska had a higher percentage, with roughly 14 percent of Alaska's population over 18 being veterans, with Montana having roughly 12 percent of its population over 18 being veterans.

Native Americans

About 66,000 people of Native American heritage live in Montana. Multiple treaties and federal legislation, including the Indian Appropriations Act (1851), the Dawes Act (1887), and the Indian Reorganization Act (1934), enabled the creation of seven Indian reservations, encompassing 11 federally recognized tribal nations, in Montana. A 12th nation, the Little Shell Tribe of Chippewa Indians of Great Falls, was recognized by the federal government in 2020. The Blackfeet nation is headquartered on the Blackfeet Indian Reservation (1851) in Browning, Crow on the Crow Indian Reservation (1868) in Crow Agency, Confederated Salish and Kootenai and Pend d'Oreille on the Flathead Indian Reservation (1855) in Pablo, Northern Cheyenne on the Northern Cheyenne Indian Reservation (1884) at Lame Deer, Assiniboine and Gros Ventre on the Fort Belknap Indian Reservation (1888) in Fort Belknap Agency, Assiniboine and Sioux on the Fort Peck Indian Reservation (1888) at Poplar, and Chippewa-Cree on the Rocky Boy's Indian Reservation (1916) near Box Elder. Approximately 63% of all Native people live off the reservations, concentrated in the larger Montana cities, with the largest concentration of urban Indians in Great Falls. The state also has a small Métis population and 1990 census data indicated that people from as many as 275 different tribes lived in Montana.

Montana's Constitution specifically reads, "the state recognizes the distinct and unique cultural heritage of the American Indians and is committed in its educational goals to the preservation of their cultural integrity." It is the only state in the U.S. with such a constitutional mandate. The Indian Education for All Act was passed in 1999 to provide funding for this mandate and ensure implementation. It mandates that all schools teach American Indian history, culture, and heritage from preschool through college. For kindergarten through 12th-grade students, an "Indian Education for All" curriculum from the Montana Office of Public Instruction is available free to all schools. The state was sued in 2004 because of lack of funding, and the state has increased its support of the program. South Dakota passed similar legislation in 2007, and Wisconsin was working to strengthen its own program based on this model—and the current practices of Montana's schools. Each Indian reservation in the state has a fully accredited tribal college. The University of Montana "was the first to establish dual admission agreements with all of the tribal colleges and as such it was the first institution in the nation to actively facilitate student transfer from the tribal colleges."

Birth data
Note: Births in table do not add up, because Hispanics are counted both by their ethnicity and by their race, giving a higher overall number.

 Since 2016, data for births of White Hispanic origin are not collected, but included in one Hispanic group; persons of Hispanic origin may be of any race.

Languages 
English is the official language in the state of Montana. According to the 2000 census, 94.8% of the population aged five and older speak English at home. Spanish is the language next most commonly spoken at home, with about 13,040 Spanish-language speakers in the state (1.4% of the population) in 2011. Also, 15,438 (1.7% of the state population) were speakers of Indo-European languages other than English or Spanish, 10,154 (1.1%) were speakers of a Native American language, and 4,052 (0.4%) were speakers of an Asian or Pacific Islander language. Other languages spoken in Montana (as of 2013) include Assiniboine (about 150 speakers in Montana and Canada), Blackfoot (about 100 speakers), Cheyenne (about 1,700 speakers), Plains Cree (about 100 speakers), Crow (about 3,000 speakers), Dakota (about 18,800 speakers in Minnesota, Montana, Nebraska, North Dakota, and South Dakota), German Hutterite (about 5,600 speakers), Gros Ventre (about 10 speakers), Kalispel-Pend d'Oreille (about 64 speakers), Kutenai (about six speakers), and Lakota (about 6,000 speakers in Minnesota, Montana, Nebraska, North Dakota, South Dakota). The United States Department of Education estimated in 2009 that 5,274 students in Montana spoke a language at home other than English. These included a Native American language (64%), German (4%), Spanish (3%), Russian (1%), and Chinese (less than 0.5%).

Religion

According to the Pew Research Center in 2014, the religious affiliations of the people of Montana were predominantly Christian; in the state, Christianity was 65% of the total adult population. At the 2020 Public Religion Research Institute's study, 57% of the adult population were Christian. While Catholicism was the largest single Christian group in the state, mainline and evangelical Protestantism dominated the Christian landscape collectively. In 2014, 30% of the population was irreligious, and in 2020's separate study, 34% of the population were irreligious.

The largest denominations in Montana as of 2010 were the Catholic Church with 127,612 adherents, the Church of Jesus Christ of Latter-day Saints with 46,484 adherents, Evangelical Lutheran Church in America with 38,665 adherents, and nondenominational Evangelical Protestant with 27,370 adherents.

Economy

, the U.S. Bureau of Economic Analysis estimated Montana's state product was $51.91 billion (47th in the nation) and per capita personal income was $41,280 (37th in the nation).

 Total employment: 371,239
 Total employer establishments: 38,720

Montana is a relative hub of beer microbrewing, ranking third in the nation in number of craft breweries per capita in 2011. Significant industries exist for lumber and mineral extraction; the state's resources include gold, coal, silver, talc, and vermiculite. Ecotaxes on resource extraction are numerous. A 1974 state severance tax on coal (which varied from 20 to 30%) was upheld by the Supreme Court of the United States in Commonwealth Edison Co. v. Montana, 453 U.S. 609 (1981).

Tourism is also important to the economy, with more than ten million visitors a year to Glacier National Park, Flathead Lake, the Missouri River headwaters, the site of the Battle of Little Bighorn, and three of the five entrances to Yellowstone National Park.

Montana's personal income tax contains seven brackets, with rates ranging from 1.0 to 6.9 percent. Montana has no sales tax, and household goods are exempt from property taxes. However, property taxes are assessed on livestock, farm machinery, heavy equipment, automobiles, trucks, and business equipment. The amount of property tax owed is not determined solely by the property's value. The property's value is multiplied by a tax rate, set by the Montana Legislature, to determine its taxable value. The taxable value is then multiplied by the mill levy established by various taxing jurisdictions—city and county government, school districts, and others.

In the 1980s the absence of a sales tax became economically deleterious to communities bound to the state's tourism industry, as the revenue from income and property taxes provided by residents was grossly insignificant in regards to paying for the impact of non-residential travel—especially road repair. In 1985, the Montana Legislature passed a law allowing towns with fewer than 5,500 residents and unincorporated communities with fewer than 2,500 to levy a resort tax if more than half the community's income came from tourism. The resort tax is a sales tax that applies to hotels, motels and other lodging and camping facilities; restaurants, fast-food stores, and other food service establishments; taverns, bars, night clubs, lounges, or other public establishments that serve alcohol; as well as destination ski resorts or other destination recreational facilities.

It also applies to "luxuries"- defined by law as any item normally sold to the public or to transient visitors or tourists that does not include food purchased unprepared or unserved, medicine, medical supplies and services, appliances, hardware supplies and tools, or any necessities of life. Approximately 12.2 million non-residents visited Montana in 2018, and the population was estimated to be 1.06 million. This extremely disproportionate ratio of residents paying taxes vs. non-residents using state-funded services and infrastructure makes Montana's resort tax crucial in order to safely maintain heavily used roads and highways, as well as protect and preserve state parks.

, the state's unemployment rate is 3.5%.

Education

Colleges and universities

The Montana University System consists of:

 Dawson Community College
 Flathead Valley Community College
 Miles Community College
 Montana State University Bozeman
 Gallatin College Montana State University Bozeman
 Montana State University Billings
 City College at Montana State University Billings Billings
 Montana State University-Northern Havre
 Great Falls College Montana State University Great Falls
 University of Montana Missoula
 Missoula College University of Montana Missoula
 Montana Tech of the University of Montana Butte
 Highlands College of Montana Tech Butte
 University of Montana Western Dillon
 Helena College University of Montana Helena
 Bitterroot College University of Montana Hamilton

Tribal colleges in Montana include:

 Aaniiih Nakoda College Harlem
 Blackfeet Community College Browning
 Chief Dull Knife College Lame Deer
 Fort Peck Community College Poplar
 Little Big Horn College Crow Agency
 Salish Kootenai College Pablo
 Stone Child College Box Elder

Four private colleges are in Montana:

 Carroll College
 Rocky Mountain College
 University of Providence
 Apollos University

Schools
The Montana Territory was formed on April 26, 1864, when the U.S. passed the Organic Act. Schools started forming in the area before it was officially a territory as families started settling into the area. The first schools were subscription schools that typically met in the teacher's home. The first formal school on record was at Fort Owen in Bitterroot valley in 1862. The students were Indian children and the children of Fort Owen employees. The first school term started in early winter and lasted only until February 28. Classes were taught by Mr. Robinson. Another early subscription school was started by Thomas Dimsdale in Virginia City in 1863. In this school students were charged $1.75 per week. The Montana Territorial Legislative Assembly had its inaugural meeting in 1864. The first legislature authorized counties to levy taxes for schools, which set the foundations for public schooling. Madison County was the first to take advantage of the newly authorized taxes and it formed the first public school in Virginia City in 1886. The first school year was scheduled to begin in January 1866, but severe weather postponed its opening until March. The first school year ran through the summer and did not end until August 17. One of the first teachers at the school was Sarah Raymond. She was a 25-year-old woman who had traveled to Virginia City via wagon train in 1865. To become a certified teacher, Raymond took a test in her home and paid a $6 fee in gold dust to obtain a teaching certificate. With the help of an assistant teacher, Mrs. Farley, Raymond was responsible for teaching 50 to 60 students each day out of the 81 students enrolled at the school. Sarah Raymond was paid $125 per month, and Mrs. Farley was paid $75 per month. No textbooks were used in the school. In their place was an assortment of books brought by various emigrants. Sarah quit teaching the following year, but she later became the Madison County superintendent of schools.

Culture

Many well-known artists, photographers and authors have documented the land, culture and people of Montana in the last 130 years. Painter and sculptor Charles Marion Russell, known as "the cowboy artist", created more than 2,000 paintings of cowboys, Native Americans, and landscapes set in the Western United States and in Alberta, Canada. The C. M. Russell Museum Complex in Great Falls, Montana, houses more than 2,000 Russell artworks, personal objects, and artifacts.

Pioneering feminist author, film-maker, and media personality Mary MacLane attained international fame in 1902 with her memoir of three months in her life in Butte, The Story of Mary MacLane. She referred to Butte throughout the rest of her career and remains a controversial figure there for her mixture of criticism and love for Butte and its people.

Evelyn Cameron, a naturalist and photographer from Terry documented early 20th-century life on the Montana prairie, taking startlingly clear pictures of everything around her: cowboys, sheepherders, weddings, river crossings, freight wagons, people working, badlands, eagles, coyotes and wolves.

Many notable Montana authors have documented or been inspired by life in Montana in both fiction and non-fiction works. Pulitzer Prize winner Wallace Earle Stegner from Great Falls was often called "The Dean of Western Writers". James Willard Schultz ("Apikuni") from Browning is most noted for his prolific stories about Blackfeet life and his contributions to the naming of prominent features in Glacier National Park.

Major cultural events

Montana hosts numerous arts and cultural festivals and events every year. Major events include:
 Bozeman was once known as the "Sweet Pea capital of the nation" referencing the prolific edible pea crop. To promote the area and celebrate its prosperity, local business owners began a "Sweet Pea Carnival" that included a parade and queen contest. The annual event lasted from 1906 to 1916. Promoters used the inedible but fragrant and colorful sweet pea flower as an emblem of the celebration. In 1977 the "Sweet Pea" concept was revived as an arts festival rather than a harvest celebration, growing into a three-day event that is one of the largest festivals in Montana.
 Montana Shakespeare in the Parks has been performing free, live theatrical productions of Shakespeare and other classics throughout Montana and the Northwest region since 1973. The organization is an outreach endeavor that is part of the College of Arts & Architecture at Montana State University, Bozeman. The Montana Shakespeare Company is based in Helena.
 Since 1909, the Crow Fair and Rodeo, near Hardin, has been an annual event every August in Crow Agency and is the largest Northern Native American gathering, attracting nearly 45,000 spectators and participants. Since 1952, North American Indian Days has been held every July in Browning.
 Lame Deer hosts the annual Northern Cheyenne Powwow.

Sports

Professional sports
There are no major league sports franchises in Montana due to the state's relatively small and dispersed population, but a number of minor league teams play in the state. Baseball is the minor-league sport with the longest heritage in the state and Montana is home to three independent teams, all members of the Pioneer League: the Billings Mustangs, Great Falls Voyagers, and Missoula PaddleHeads.

College sports
All of Montana's four-year colleges and universities field intercollegiate sports teams. The two largest schools, the University of Montana and Montana State University, are members of the Big Sky Conference and have enjoyed a strong athletic rivalry since the early twentieth century. Six of Montana's smaller four-year schools are members of the Frontier Conference. One is a member of the Great Northwest Athletic Conference.

Other sports
A variety of sports are offered at Montana high schools. Montana allows the smallest—"Class C"—high schools to utilize six-man football teams, dramatized in the independent 2002 film The Slaughter Rule.

There are junior ice hockey teams in Montana, three of which are affiliated with the North American 3 Hockey League: the Bozeman Icedogs, Great Falls Americans, and Helena Bighorns.

Olympic competitors
 Ski jumping champion and United States Skiing Hall of Fame inductee Casper Oimoen was captain of the U.S. Olympic team at the 1936 Winter Olympics while he was a resident of Anaconda. He placed thirteenth that year, and had previously finished fifth at the 1932 Winter Olympics.
 Montana has produced two U.S. champions and Olympic competitors in men's figure skating, both from Great Falls: John Misha Petkevich, lived and trained in Montana before entering college, competed in the 1968 and 1972 Winter Olympics. Scott Davis, also from Great Falls, competed at the 1994 Winter Olympics.
 Missoulian Tommy Moe won Olympic gold and silver medals at the 1994 Winter Olympics in downhill skiing and super G, the first American skier to win two medals at any Winter Olympics.
 Eric Bergoust, also of Missoula, won an Olympic gold medal in freestyle aerial skiing at the 1998 Winter Olympics, also competing in 1994, 2002 and 2006 Olympics plus winning 13 World Cup titles.
 Maggie Voisin, of Whitefish, competed in the 2018 and 2022 Winter Olympics as a skier. She also qualified for the 2014 Winter Olympics but was unable to play as she broke her ankle during training.

Sporting achievements
Montanans have been a part of several major sporting achievements:
 In 1889, Spokane became the first and only Montana horse to win the Kentucky Derby. For this accomplishment, the horse was admitted to the Montana Cowboy Hall of Fame in 2008.
 In 1904 a basketball team of young Native American women from Fort Shaw, after playing undefeated during their previous season, went to the Louisiana Purchase Exposition held in St. Louis in 1904, defeated all challenging teams and were declared to be world champions.
 In 1923, the controversial Jack Dempsey vs. Tommy Gibbons fight for the heavyweight boxing championship, won by Dempsey, took place in Shelby.

Outdoor recreation
Montana provides year-round outdoor recreation opportunities for residents and visitors. Hiking, fishing, hunting, watercraft recreation, camping, golf, cycling, horseback riding, and skiing are popular activities.

Fishing and hunting
Montana has been a destination for its world-class trout fisheries since the 1930s. Fly fishing for several species of native and introduced trout in rivers and lakes is popular for both residents and tourists throughout the state. Montana is the home of the Federation of Fly Fishers and hosts many of the organization's annual conclaves. The state has robust recreational lake trout and kokanee salmon fisheries in the west, walleye can be found in many parts of the state, while northern pike, smallmouth and largemouth bass fisheries as well as catfish and paddlefish can be found in the waters of eastern Montana. Robert Redford's 1992 film of Norman Mclean's novel, A River Runs Through It, was filmed in Montana and brought national attention to fly fishing and the state. Fishing makes up a sizeable component of Montana's total tourism economic output: in 2017, nonresidents generated $4.7 billion in economic output, of which, $1.3 billion was generated by visitor groups participating in guided fishing experiences. 

There are fall bow and general hunting seasons for elk, pronghorn antelope, whitetail deer and mule deer. A random draw grants a limited number of permits for moose, mountain goats and bighorn sheep. There is a spring hunting season for black bear and limited hunting of bison that leave Yellowstone National Park has been allowed. Current law allows both hunters and trappers specified numbers ("limits") of wolves and mountain lions. Trapping of assorted fur-bearing animals is allowed in certain seasons and many opportunities exist for migratory waterfowl and upland bird hunting. The Rocky Mountain Elk Foundation, which protects wildlife habitat and promotes hunting heritage, was founded in Montana.

Winter sports

Both downhill skiing and cross-country skiing are popular in Montana, and there are 15 developed downhill ski areas open to the public, including:
 Bear Paw Ski Bowl near Havre
 Big Sky Resort in Big Sky
 Blacktail Mountain Ski Area near Lakeside
 Bridger Bowl Ski Area near Bozeman
 Discovery Ski Area near Philipsburg
 Great Divide Ski Area near Helena
 Lookout Pass Ski and Recreation Area off Interstate 90 at the Montana-Idaho border
 Lost Trail Powder Mountain near Darby
 Maverick Mountain Ski Area near Dillon
 Montana Snowbowl near Missoula
 Red Lodge Mountain Resort near Red Lodge
 Showdown Ski Area near White Sulphur Springs
 Teton Pass Ski Area near Choteau
 Turner Mountain Ski Resort near Libby
 Whitefish Mountain Resort near Whitefish

Big Sky Resort and Whitefish Mountain Resort are destination resorts, while the remaining areas do not have overnight lodging at the ski area, though several host restaurants and other amenities.

Montana also has millions of acres open to cross-country skiing on nine of its national forests and in Glacier National Park. In addition to cross-country trails at most of the downhill ski areas, there are also 13 private cross-country skiing resorts. Yellowstone National Park also allows cross-country skiing.

Snowmobiling is popular in Montana, which boasts over 4,000 miles of trails and frozen lakes available in winter. There are 24 areas where snowmobile trails are maintained, most also offering ungroomed trails. West Yellowstone offers a large selection of trails and is the primary starting point for snowmobile trips into Yellowstone National Park, where "oversnow" vehicle use is strictly limited, usually to guided tours, and regulations are in considerable flux.

Snow coach tours are offered at Big Sky, Whitefish, West Yellowstone and into Yellowstone National Park. Equestrian skijoring has a niche in Montana, which hosts the World Skijoring Championships in Whitefish as part of the annual Whitefish Winter Carnival.

Health
Montana does not have a Trauma I hospital but does have Trauma II hospitals in Missoula, Billings, and Great Falls. In 2013, AARP The Magazine named the Billings Clinic one of the safest hospitals in the United States.

Montana is ranked as the least obese state in the U.S., at 19.6%, according to the 2014 Gallup Poll.

Montana had a suicide rate of 26.1 per 100,000 in 2020, which is the 3rd-highest among U.S. states; high suicide rates are common among sparsely-populated states in the United States

Media

As of 2010, Missoula is the 166th largest media market in the United States as ranked by Nielsen Media Research, while Billings is 170th, Great Falls is 190th, the Butte/Bozeman area 191st, and Helena is 206th. There are 25 television stations in Montana, representing each major U.S. network. As of August 2013, there are 527 FCC-licensed FM radio stations broadcast in Montana, with 114 such AM stations.

During the age of the Copper Kings, each Montana copper company had its own newspaper. This changed in 1959 when Lee Enterprises bought several Montana newspapers. Montana's largest circulating daily city newspapers are the Billings Gazette (circulation 39,405), Great Falls Tribune (26,733), and Missoulian (25,439).

Transportation

Railroads have been an important method of transportation in Montana since the 1880s. Historically, the state was traversed by the main lines of three east–west transcontinental routes: the Milwaukee Road, the Great Northern, and the Northern Pacific. Today, the BNSF Railway is the state's largest railroad, its main transcontinental route incorporating the former Great Northern main line across the state. Montana RailLink, a privately held Class II railroad, operates former Northern Pacific trackage in western Montana.

In addition, Amtrak's Empire Builder train runs through the north of the state, stopping in Libby, Whitefish, West Glacier, Essex, East Glacier Park, Browning, Cut Bank, Shelby, Havre, Malta, Glasgow, and Wolf Point.

Intercity bus service in Montana is provided by Jefferson Lines and Express Arrow.

Bozeman Yellowstone International Airport is the busiest airport in the state of Montana, surpassing Billings Logan International Airport in the spring of 2013. Montana's other major airports include Missoula International Airport, Great Falls International Airport, Glacier Park International Airport, Helena Regional Airport, Bert Mooney Airport, and Yellowstone Airport. Eight smaller communities have airports designated for commercial service under the Essential Air Service program.

Historically, U.S. Route 10 was the primary east–west highway route across Montana, connecting the major cities in the southern half of the state. Still, the state's most important east–west travel corridor, the route is today served by Interstate 90 and Interstate 94 which roughly follow the same route as the Northern Pacific. U.S. Routes 2 and 12 and Montana Highway 200 also traverse the entire state from east to west.

Montana's only north–south Interstate Highway is Interstate 15. Other major north–south highways include U.S. Routes 87, 89, 93, and 191.

Montana and South Dakota are the only states to share a land border that is not traversed by a paved road. Highway 212, the primary paved route between the two, passes through the northeast corner of Wyoming between Montana and South Dakota.

Law and government

Constitution
Montana is governed by a constitution. The first constitution was drafted by a constitutional convention in 1889, in preparation for statehood. Ninety percent of its language came from an 1884 constitution which was never acted upon by Congress for national political reasons. The 1889 constitution mimicked the structure of the United States Constitution, as well as outlining almost the same civil and political rights for citizens. However, the 1889 Montana constitution significantly restricted the power of state government, the legislature was much more powerful than the executive branch, and the jurisdiction of the District Courts very specifically described. Montana voters amended the 1889 constitution 37 times between 1889 and 1972. In 1914, Montana granted women the vote. In 1916, Montana became the first state to elect a woman, Progressive Republican Jeannette Rankin, to Congress.

In 1971, Montana voters approved the call for a state constitutional convention. A new constitution was drafted, which made the legislative and executive branches much more equal in power and which was much less prescriptive in outlining powers, duties, and jurisdictions. The draft included an expanded, more progressive list of civil and political rights, extended these rights to children for the first time, transferred administration of property taxes to the counties from the state, implemented new water rights, eliminated sovereign immunity, and gave the legislature greater power to spend tax revenues. The constitution was narrowly approved, 116,415 to 113,883, and declared ratified on June 20, 1972. Three issues that the constitutional convention was unable to resolve were submitted to voters simultaneously with the proposed constitution. Voters approved the legalization of gambling, a bicameral legislature, and retention of the death penalty.

The 1972 constitution has been amended 31 times as of 2015. Major amendments include establishment of a reclamation trust (funded by taxes on natural resource extraction) to restore mined land (1974); restoration of sovereign immunity, when such immunity has been approved by a two-thirds vote in each house (1974); establishment of a 90-day biennial (rather than annual) legislative session (1974); establishment of a coal tax trust fund, funded by a tax on coal extraction (1976); conversion of the mandatory decennial review of county government into a voluntary one, to be approved or disallowed by residents in each county (1978); conversion of the provision of public assistance from a mandatory civil right to a non-fundamental legislative prerogative (1988); a new constitutional right to hunt and fish (2004); a prohibition on gay marriage (2004); and a prohibition on new taxes on the sale or transfer of real property (2010). In 1992, voters approved a constitutional amendment implementing term limits for certain statewide elected executive branch offices (governor, lieutenant governor, secretary of state, state auditor, attorney general, superintendent of public instruction) and for members of the Montana Legislature. Extensive new constitutional rights for victims of crime were approved in 2016.

The 1972 constitution requires that voters determine every 20 years whether to hold a new constitutional convention. Voters turned down a new convention in 1990 (84 percent no) and again in 2010 (58.6 percent no).

Executive

Montana has three branches of state government: legislative, executive, and judicial. The executive branch is headed by an elected governor. The governor is Greg Gianforte, a Republican elected in 2020. There are also nine other statewide elected offices in the executive branch: Lieutenant Governor, Attorney General, Secretary of State, State Auditor (who also serves as Commissioner of Securities and Insurance), and Superintendent of Public Instruction. There are five public service commissioners, who are elected on a regional basis. (The Public Service Commission's jurisdiction is statewide.)

There are 18 departments and offices which make up the executive branch: Administration; Agriculture; Auditor (securities and insurance); Commerce; Corrections; Environmental Quality; Fish, Wildlife & Parks; Justice; Labor and Industry; Livestock; Military Affairs; Natural Resources and Conservation; Public Health and Human Services; Revenue; State; and Transportation. Elementary and secondary education are overseen by the Office of Public Instruction (led by the elected superintendent of public instruction), in cooperation with the governor-appointed Board of Public Education. Higher education is overseen by a governor-appointed Board of Regents, which in turn appoints a commissioner of higher education. The Office of the Commissioner of Higher Education acts in an executive capacity on behalf of the regents and oversees the state-run Montana University System.

Independent state agencies not within a department or office include the Montana Arts Council, Montana Board of Crime Control, Montana Historical Society, Montana Public Employees Retirement Administration, Commissioner of Political Practices, the Montana Lottery, Office of the State Public Defender, Public Service Commission, the Montana School for the Deaf and Blind, the Montana State Fund (which operates the state's unemployment insurance, worker compensation, and self-insurance operations), the Montana State Library, and the Montana Teachers Retirement System.

Montana is an alcoholic beverage control state. It is an equitable distribution and no-fault divorce state. It is one of five states to have no sales tax.

Legislative
The Montana Legislature is bicameral and consists of the 50-member Montana Senate and the 100-member Montana House of Representatives. The legislature meets in the Montana State Capitol in Helena in odd-numbered years for 90 days, beginning the first weekday of the year. The deadline for a legislator to introduce a general bill is the 40th legislative day. The deadline for a legislator to introduce an appropriations, revenue, or referendum bill is the 62nd legislative day. Senators serve four-year terms, while Representatives serve two-year terms. All members are limited to serving no more than eight years in a single 16-year period.

Judicial
The Courts of Montana are established by the Constitution of Montana. The constitution requires the establishment of a Montana Supreme Court and Montana District Courts, and permits the legislature to establish Justice Courts, City Courts, Municipal Courts, and other inferior courts such as the legislature sees fit to establish.

The Montana Supreme Court is the court of last resort in the Montana court system. The constitution of 1889 provided for the election of no fewer than three Supreme Court justices, and one chief justice. Each court member served a six-year term. The legislature increased the number of justices to five in 1919. The 1972 constitution lengthened the term of office to eight years and established the minimum number of justices at five. It allowed the legislature to increase the number of justices by two, which the legislature did in 1979. The Montana Supreme Court has the authority to declare acts of the legislature and executive unconstitutional under either the Montana or U.S. constitutions. Its decisions may be appealed directly to the U.S. Supreme Court. The Clerk of the Montana Supreme Court is also an elected position and serves a six-year term. Neither justices nor the clerk is term-limited.

Montana District Courts are the courts of general jurisdiction in Montana. There are no intermediate appellate courts. District Courts have jurisdiction primarily over most civil cases, cases involving a monetary claim against the state, felony criminal cases, probate, and cases at law and in equity. When so authorized by the legislature, actions of executive branch agencies may be appealed directly to a District Court. The District Courts also have de novo appellate jurisdiction from inferior courts (city courts, justice courts, and municipal courts), and oversee naturalization proceedings. District Court judges are elected and serve six-year terms. They are not term-limited. There are 22 judicial districts in Montana, served by 56 District Courts and 46 District Court judges. The District Courts suffer from excessive workload, and the legislature has struggled to find a solution to the problem.

Montana Youth Courts were established by the Montana Youth Court Act of 1974. They are overseen by District Court judges. They consist of a chief probation officer, one or more juvenile probation officers, and support staff. Youth Courts have jurisdiction over misdemeanor and felony acts committed by those charged as a juvenile under the law. There is a Youth Court in every judicial district, and decisions of the Youth Court are appealable directly to the Montana Supreme Court.

The Montana Worker's Compensation Court was established by the Montana Workers' Compensation Act in 1975. There is a single Workers' Compensation Court. It has a single judge, appointed by the governor. The Worker's Compensation Court has statewide jurisdiction and holds trials in Billings, Great Falls, Helena, Kalispell, and Missoula. The court hears cases arising under the Montana Workers' Compensation Act and is the court of original jurisdiction for reviews of orders and regulations issued by the Montana Department of Labor and Industry. Decisions of the court are appealable directly to the Montana Supreme Court.

The Montana Water Court was established by the Montana Water Court Act of 1979. The Water Court consists of a chief water judge and four district water judges (Lower Missouri River Basin, Upper Missouri River Basin, Yellowstone River Basin, and Clark Fork River Basin). The court employs 12 permanent special masters. The Montana Judicial Nomination Commission develops short lists of nominees for all five Water Judges, who are then appointed by the Chief justice of the Montana Supreme Court (subject to confirmation by the Montana Senate). The Water Court adjudicates water rights claims under the Montana Water Use Act of 1973 and has statewide jurisdiction. District Courts have the authority to enforce decisions of the Water Court, but only the Montana Supreme Court has the authority to review decisions of the Water Court.

From 1889 to 1909, elections for judicial office in Montana were partisan. Beginning in 1909, these elections became nonpartisan. The Montana Supreme Court struck down the nonpartisan law in 1911 on technical grounds, but a new law was enacted in 1935 which barred political parties from endorsing, making contributions to, or making expenditures on behalf of or against judicial candidates. In 2012, the U.S. Supreme Court struck down Montana's judicial nonpartisan election law in Although candidates must remain nonpartisan, spending by partisan entities is now permitted. Spending on state supreme court races exponentially increased to $1.6 million in 2014, and to more than $1.6 million in 2016 (both new records).

Federal offices and courts
The U.S. Constitution provides each state with two senators. Montana's two U.S. senators are Jon Tester (Democrat), who was reelected in 2018, and Steve Daines (Republican), first elected in 2014 and later reelected in 2020. The U.S. Constitution provides each state with a single representative, with additional representatives apportioned based on population. From statehood in 1889 until 1913, Montana was represented in the United States House of Representatives by a single representative, elected at-large. Montana received a second representative in 1913, following the 1910 census and reapportionment. Both members, however, were still elected at-large. Beginning in 1919, Montana moved to district, rather than at-large, elections for its two House members. This created Montana's 1st congressional district in the west and Montana's 2nd congressional district in the east. In the reapportionment following the 1990 census, Montana lost one of its House seats. The remaining seat was again elected at-large.

In the reapportionment following the 2020 census, Montana regained a House seat, increasing the state's number of representatives in the House to two after a thirty-year break, starting from 2023. Republicans Matt Rosendale and Ryan Zinke are the current officeholders.

Montana's Senate district is the fourth largest by area, behind Alaska, Texas, and California. The most notorious of Montana's early senators was William A. Clark, a "Copper King" and one of the 50 richest Americans ever. He is well known for having bribed his way into the U.S. Senate. Among Montana's most historically prominent senators are Thomas J. Walsh (serving from 1913 to 1933), who was President-elect Franklin D. Roosevelt's choice for attorney general when he died; Burton K. Wheeler (serving from 1923 to 1947), an oft-mentioned presidential candidate and strong supporter of isolationism; Mike Mansfield, the longest-serving Senate majority leader in U.S. history; Max Baucus (served 1978 to 2014), longest-serving U.S. senator in Montana history, and the senator who shepherded the Patient Protection and Affordable Care Act through the Senate in 2010; and Lee Metcalf (served 1961 to 1978), a pioneer of the environmental movement.

Montana's House district is the largest congressional district in the United States by population, with just over 1,023,000 constituents. It is the second-largest House district by area, after Alaska's at-large congressional district. Of Montana's House delegates, Jeannette Rankin was the first woman to hold national office in the United States when she was elected to the U.S. House of Representatives in 1916. Also notable is Representative (later Senator) Thomas H. Carter, the first Catholic to serve as chairman of the Republican National Committee (from 1892 to 1896).

Federal courts in Montana include the United States District Court for the District of Montana and the United States Bankruptcy Court for the District of Montana. Three former Montana politicians have been named judges on the U.S. District Court: Charles Nelson Pray (who served in the U.S. House of Representatives from 1907 to 1913), James F. Battin (who served in the U.S. House of Representatives from 1961 to 1969), and Paul G. Hatfield (who served as an appointed U.S. Senator in 1978). Brian Morris, who served as an associate justice of the Montana Supreme Court from 2005 to 2013, currently serves as a judge on the court.

Politics

The state has a reputation for a libertarian bent in popular opinion and policy, with political scientist Lee Banville summarizing the attitude of Montanians as "basically ‘leave me alone’ and leave my rights alone... I like the right to abortion. I like my guns and want the government out of my business." Elections in the state have been historically competitive, particularly for state-level offices. The Democratic Party's strength in the state is gained from support among unionized miners and railroad workers, while farmers generally vote Republican.

Montana has a history of voters splitting their tickets and filling elected offices with individuals from both parties. Through the mid-20th century, the state had a tradition of "sending the liberals to Washington and the conservatives to Helena". Between 1988 and 2006, the pattern flipped, with voters more likely to elect conservatives to federal offices. There have also been long-term shifts in party control. From 1968 through 1988, the state was dominated by the Democratic Party, with Democratic governors for a 20-year period, and a Democratic majority of both the national congressional delegation and during many sessions of the state legislature. This pattern shifted, beginning with the 1988 election when Montana elected a Republican governor for the first time since 1964 and sent a Republican to the U.S. Senate for the first time since 1948. This shift continued with the reapportionment of the state's legislative districts that took effect in 1994, when the Republican Party took control of both chambers of the state legislature, consolidating a Republican party dominance that lasted until the 2004 reapportionment produced more swing districts and a brief period of Democratic legislative majorities in the mid-2000s.

Montana has voted for the Republican nominee in all but two presidential elections since 1952. The state last supported a Democrat for president in 1992, when Bill Clinton won a plurality victory. However, since 1889 the state has voted for Democratic governors 60 percent of the time, and Republican governors 40 percent of the time. In the 2008 presidential election, Montana was considered a swing state and was ultimately won by Republican John McCain by a narrow margin of two percent.

At the state level, the pattern of split-ticket voting and divided government holds. Democrats hold one of the state's two U.S. Senate seats with Jon Tester. The lone congressional district has been Republican since 1996, and its Class 2 Senate seat has been held by Republican Steve Daines since 2014. The two chambers of the state's legislature had split party control from 2004 to 2010, when that year's mid-term elections decisively returned both branches to Republican control. The Montana Senate is, as of 2021, controlled by Republicans 31 to 19, and the House of Representatives is currently 67 to 33. Historically, Republicans are strongest in the east, while Democrats are strongest in the west.

Montana had only one representative in the U.S. House after having lost its second district in the 1990 census reapportionment. However, it regained its second district due to reapportionment following the 2020 census. Before the 2020 reapportionment, Montana's at-large congressional district held the largest population of any district in the country, which means its one member in the House of Representatives represented more people than any other member of the U.S. House (see List of U.S. states by population). Montana's population grew at about the national average during the 2000s, but it had failed to regain its second seat in 2010.

In a 2020 study, Montana was ranked as the 21st easiest state for citizens to vote in.

See also

Index of Montana-related articles
List of the oldest buildings in Montana
Outline of Montana
Timeline of Montana history

Notes

References

Bibliography

 
 
 
 
 
 
 
 
 
 
 
 
 
 
 
 
 
 
 
 
 
 
 
 
 
 
 
 
 
 
 
 
 
 
 
 
 
 
 
 
 
 
 
 
 
 
 
 
 
 
 
 
 
 
 
 
 
 
 
 
 
 
 
 
 
 
 
 
 
 
 
 
 
 
 
  Reviewed by

Further reading

External links

 Census of Montana
 General Information About Montana
 
 List of Searchable Databases Produced by Montana State Agencies
 Montana Energy Data & Statistics—From the U.S. Department of Energy
 Montana Historical Society
 Montana Official Travel Information Site
 Montana Official Website
 
 Montana State Facts From the U.S. Department of Agriculture
 USGS Real-time, Geographic, and Other Scientific Resources of Montana 

 
1889 establishments in the United States
States and territories established in 1889
States of the United States
Western United States
Contiguous United States